Devaki Gopidas (1918-1973) was an Indian politician from Kerala. She was a Member of Parliament, representing Kerala in the Rajya Sabha the upper house of India's Parliament as a member of the Indian National Congress from 1962 - 1968. 

She was killed in the crash of Indian Airlines Flight 440 on May 31 1973.

Education 
She completed schooling from Kottayam and college education from Government College for Women, Thiruvananthapuram. She entered into Congress politics in college. Later she studied law from Kolkata.

Personal life and death 
She was born in an Ezhava family at Karappuzha, Kottayam district on 10 May 1918 to Arangaserry Narayanan and T K Narayani. She married Gopidas from Vezhapra and settled in Kolkata.

Devaki died due to crash of Indian Airlines Flight 440 in 1973.

References

Rajya Sabha members from Kerala
Indian National Congress politicians
Women in Kerala politics
1918 births
1973 deaths
Women members of the Rajya Sabha